"Angel" is a song by Elvis Presley from the film Follow That Dream and was released on the soundtrack EP of the same name in April 1962.

Recording
"Angel" was recorded at RCA Studio B in Nashville Tennessee and it took seven takes to recorded the final version. It was released as single; however, this was only in South Africa and Rhodesia in February 1965.

Cliff Richard version

In 1965, Cliff Richard released a cover of the song on his eponymous seventh studio, which was also released as a single.

Release
"Angel" was pressed in the UK, though was released as an export-only single. It was released in Australia and most of Europe with the B-side "Razzle Dazzle", written by Charles Calhoun and first released by Bill Haley & His Comets in 1955. In Germany, "Angel" was released with the B-side "House Without Windows", written by Fred Tobias and Lee Pockriss and first released by Steve Lawrence in 1962. The song was officially released in the UK as the title track to an EP in September 1965.

Track listing
7"
 "Angel" – 2:22
 "Razzle Dazzle" – 2:04

7" (Germany)
 "Angel" – 2:22
 "House Without Windows" – 2:29

7" (Japan)
 "Angel" – 2:22
 "Again" – 2:34

EP
 "Angel" – 2:22
 "I Only Came to Say Goodbye" – 2:26
 "On My Word" – 2:30
 "The Minute You're Gone" – 2:43

Charts

References

Cliff Richard songs
Elvis Presley songs
1965 singles
1962 songs
Songs written by Sid Tepper
Songs written by Roy C. Bennett
Columbia Graphophone Company singles
Song recordings produced by Billy Sherrill
Songs written for films